William Strong may refer to:

William Strong (priest) (died 1654), English clergyman
William Strong (Vermont politician) (1763–1840), member of the United States House of Representatives from Vermont
William Kerley Strong (1805–1867), brigadier general during the American Civil War
William Strong (Pennsylvania judge) (1808–1895), U.S. Supreme Court judge who also served on the Supreme Court of Pennsylvania and as a U. S. congressman
William Barstow Strong (1837–1914), American railroad executive
William Duncan Strong (1899–1962), American archaeologist and anthropologist
William Lafayette Strong (1827–1900), Mayor of New York City
William Strong (Oregon judge) (1817–1887), American judge on the Oregon Supreme Court and Washington Supreme Court
William Lightbourn Strong (1782–1859), American pastor
William G. Strong (1819–?), merchant and political figure in Prince Edward Island
William Strong (Archdeacon of Northampton) (1756–1842)